Lisa Loven Kongsli (born 23 September 1979) is a Norwegian actress.

She debuted as an actress in 2008, and has since had key parts in Norwegian films. She has also had roles in films, including Fatso (2008), Knerten (2009), and The Orheim Company (2012).

In 2014, she was nominated in the Best Actress category at the 50th Guldbagge Awards, for her role as Ebba in Ruben Östlund's film Force Majeure.

She played Amazon warrior Menalippe in the 2017 film Wonder Woman, reprising the role the same year in the film Justice League, as well as the subsequent 2021 director's cut Zack Snyder's Justice League.

References

External links 

1979 births
Living people
21st-century Norwegian actresses
Actresses from Oslo
Norwegian film actresses
Norwegian television actresses